Lycomorphodes splendida is a moth of the family Erebidae. It was described by Max Wilhelm Karl Draudt in 1918. It is found in Colombia.

References

 

Cisthenina
Moths described in 1918